Jaco van der Walt (born ) is a South African rugby union player. A fly-half or fullback, he plays for Edinburgh Rugby and represents Scotland after qualifying through the three year residency rule.

Rugby Union career

Amateur career
In 2010, he played at the Under-16 Grant Khomo Week competition and he played at both the 2011 and 2012 editions of the Under-18 Craven Week. He was also included in the South African Schools squad in both those seasons.

He then played for the  side in the 2012 and the 2013 Under-19 Provincial Championships, making just one appearance in each.

He also represented local university side  during the 2014 Varsity Cup competition, making 7 appearances.

Professional career
His first class debut for the  came as a 20-year-old in the first match of the 2014 Currie Cup Premier Division. First-choice fly-half Marnitz Boshoff left the field ten minutes into the second half with a fractured arm, which led to Van der Walt's introduction. He kicked one conversion and two penalties as the Golden Lions ran out 41–13 winners.

In November 2017, Scottish Pro14 side Edinburgh announced that Van der Walt joined them on a two-and-a-half-year contract.

In January 2021, Van der Walt signed an undisclosed-length contract extension with Edinburgh, saying the capital club were "building a really strong side."

International career
He made his international debut for Scotland against Ireland, at the Aviva Stadium in Dublin, on 5 December 2020. He scored 3 penalties and 1 conversion in a match Scotland lost 16-31.

Personal life
He is the older brother of Gerdus van der Walt.

Jaco van der Walt’s grandfather was a detective in the Dutch police force before emigrating to South Africa.

References

1994 births
Alumni of Monument High School
Living people
Scotland international rugby union players
South African rugby union players
People from Randfontein
Rugby union fly-halves
Golden Lions players
Rugby union players from Gauteng
Edinburgh Rugby players
Lions (United Rugby Championship) players
Scottish rugby union players